The 2018 elections for the Pennsylvania House of Representatives was held on November 6, 2018, with all districts being decided. The term of office for those that were elected in 2018 began when the House of Representatives convened in January 2019. Pennsylvania State Representatives are elected for two-year terms, with all 203 seats up for election every two years. The election coincided with the election for Governor and one-half of the State Senate. The Republican Party maintained its majority in the House of Representatives despite receiving less than 45% of the popular vote.

Special elections

35th legislative district 
Democratic state representative Marc Gergely resigned his seat on November 6, 2017 after pleading guilty to charges regarding an illegal gambling machine ring. A special election for the 35th legislative district was held on January 23, 2018 to fill the seat.

Democrats selected Austin Davis, an assistant to Allegheny County executive Rich Fitzgerald, as their nominee. Republicans nominated Fawn Walker-Montgomery. Davis won the special election in the heavily Democratic district.

48th legislative district 
Democratic state representative Brandon Neuman was elected to be a judge on the Washington County Court of Common Pleas in 2017. A special election to fill his House seat was held on May 15, 2018 in conjunction with the 2018 primary.

Democrats nominated attorney Clark Mitchell Jr, while Republicans nominated Afghan War veteran Tim O'Neal. Both candidates also ran for their respective party's nomination for the 2018 general election. Libertarian candidate Demosthenes Agoris also ran in this special election. O'Neal won the special election, flipping a seat into GOP hands.

68th legislative district 
Republican state representative Matt E. Baker was appointed by President Donald Trump to serve in the U.S. Department of Health and Human Services in March 2018. A special election to fill his House seat was held on May 15, 2018 in conjunction with the 2018 primary.

Democrats nominated educator Carrie Heath, while Republicans nominated businessman Clint Owlett. Both candidates also ran for their respective party's nomination for the 2018 general election. Owlett won the special election in the heavily Republican district.

178th legislative district 
Republican state representative Scott Petri was named executive director of the Philadelphia Parking Authority in December 2017. A special election to fill his House seat was held on May 15, 2018 in conjunction with the 2018 primary.

Democrats nominated Solebury Township supervisor Helen Tai, while Republicans nominated Council Rock School District board member Wendi Thomas. Both candidates also ran for their respective party's nomination for the 2018 general election. Tai defeated Thomas, flipping a seat for the Democrats, though Thomas would go on to win the seat back from Tai in the general election.

General election results overview

Close races
Districts where the margin of victory was under 10%:

Results by district

{{Election box inline candidate with party link no change
| party      = Republican Party (United States)
| candidate  = Carl Walker Metzgar
| votes      = 19,028
| percentage = 79.16''
}}Source:'''

References

2018 Pennsylvania elections
2018
Pennsylvania House of Representatives